= Gymnochrome E =

Names
- Preferred IUPAC name 2,5-Dibromo-1,6,8,10,11,13-hexahydroxy-3-[(2R)-2-hydroxypentyl]-4-[(2S)-2-hydroxypropyl]phenanthro[1,10,9,8-opqra]perylene-7,14-dione

Identifiers
3D model (JSmol)	Interactive image
ChEMBL	ChEMBL1094577
ChemSpider	24668570
PubChem CID	135894458
CompTox Dashboard (EPA)	DTXSID801045500
- InChI: InChI=1S/C36H26Br2O10/c1-3-4-10(40)6-12-18-17-11(5-9(2)39)31(37)35(47)29-23(17)27-25-19(13(41)7-15(43)21(25)33(29)45)20-14(42)8-16(44)22-26(20)28(27)24(18)30(34(22)46)36(48)32(12)38/h7-10,39-44,47-48H,3-6H2,1-2H3/t9-,10+/m0/s1 Key: FQXGDTNOEQJUMM-VHSXEESVSA-N; InChI=1/C36H26Br2O10/c1-3-4-10(40)6-12-18-17-11(5-9(2)39)31(37)35(47)29-23(17)27-25-19(13(41)7-15(43)21(25)33(29)45)20-14(42)8-16(44)22-26(20)28(27)24(18)30(34(22)46)36(48)32(12)38/h7-10,39-44,47-48H,3-6H2,1-2H3/t9-,10+/m0/s1 Key: FQXGDTNOEQJUMM-VHSXEESVBA
- SMILES: CCC[C@H](Cc1c2c3c(c(c(c4c3c5c6c(c(cc(c6c4=O)O)O)c7c(cc(c8c7c5c2c(c8=O)c(c1Br)O)O)O)O)Br)C[C@H](C)O)O

Properties
Chemical formula	C_{36}H_{26}Br_{2}O_{10}
Molar mass	778.402 g·mol^{−1}
- Except where otherwise noted, data are given for materials in their standard state (at 25 °C [77 °F], 100 kPa). Infobox references

Gymnochrome E is a cytotoxic phenanthroperylenequinone isolated from a deep-water crinoid called Holopus rangii.
